The Ligue Européenne de Natation LEN is the governing body for women's Water polo in Europe. It organises Three main Active club competitions : the LEN Euro League Women (formerly LEN European Cup), the Women's LEN Trophy, and the Women's LEN Super Cup. 
The Italian side Orizzonte Catania have won a record total of 11 titles in LEN Women's Europe club competitions, Three more than CN Sabadell from Spain.

The Italian clubs have won the most titles (25), ahead of clubs from Greece (15).

Winners

By club

The following table lists all the women's clubs that have won at least one LEN Europe club competition, and is updated as of April, 2022 (in chronological order).

Key

By country
The following table lists all the countries whose clubs have won at least one LEN competition, and is updated as of April, 2022 (in chronological order).

References

External links
LEN Official Website.

+
Water polo-related lists